Elina Svitolina was the defending champion, and successfully defended her title, defeating Bojana Jovanovski in the final 6–1, 7–6(7–2).

Seeds

Draw

Finals

Top half

Bottom half

Qualifying

Seeds

Qualifiers

Draw

First qualifier

Second qualifier

Third qualifier

Fourth qualifier

Fifth qualifier

Sixth qualifier

References

 Main Draw
 Qualifying Draw

Baku Cup - Singles
2014 Singles